Lambda Capricorni, Latinized from λ Capricorni, is a solitary star in the southern constellation of Capricornus. It is faintly visible to the naked eye with an apparent visual magnitude of +5.56. Based upon an annual parallax shift of 11.58 mas as seen from the Earth, the star is located about 282 light years from the Sun. At that distance, the visual magnitude is diminished by an extinction factor of 0.11 due to interstellar dust.

This is a white-hued A-type main sequence star with a stellar classification of A1 V. It is a magnetic Ap star, indicating the spectrum displays chemically peculiar features. The star has an estimated 2.50 times the mass of the Sun and about 2.2 times the Sun's radius. It is 155 million years old and is spinning rapidly with a projected rotational velocity of 192.5 km/s. Lambda Capricorni is radiating 45 times the Sun's luminosity from its photosphere at an effective temperature of 10,674 K.

References

A-type main-sequence stars
Capricorni, Lambda
Capricornus (constellation)
Durchmusterung objects
Capricorni, 48
207052
107517
8319